was a bureaucrat  and politician who served in the Taishō and early Shōwa period Japanese government, and as an official in the Empire of Manchukuo.

Biography
Hoshino was born in Yokohama, where his father was involved in the textile industry. His paternal aunt was principal of the Tsuda College, a noted women's university.  After World War II he was prosecuted for war crimes in Manchukuo by the International Military Tribunal of the Far East and sentenced to life imprisonment.

A member of the ruling Nikisansuke Manchukuo clique (see zaibatsu), Hoshino graduated from the law school of Tokyo Imperial University, and on graduation was employed by the Ministry of Finance. He rose through the ranks in various capacities, ranging from bank regulation to taxation, and in 1932, became vice minister of industrial development.

Following the Japanese invasion of Manchuria and the establishment of the puppet state of Manchukuo he led a team of bureaucrats from the Ministry of Finance to provide an infrastructure for finances for the new territory in July 1932. From 1937 he served as Vice Minister of Financial Affairs of Manchukuo. To this capacity he oversaw the creation and personally directed the State Opium Monopoly Bureau that spread the mass use of the narcotic firstly in Manchuria and then in China as a way to soften public resistance to the Japanese occupation and expansion while generating huge profits. Under his authority tens of thousands of hectares were taken over by the Japanese underworld and put under poppy production, while dozens of laboratories were built to convert opium tars into various grades of morphine and heroin; thus the economy of Manchuria became inextricably bound to hard drugs. His administrating success there, made Japan by 1935 the biggest narcotics' producer accounted for approximately three tons or 10% of the world's total supply of morphine and 37% of total heroin production. According to the testimony of General Ryukichi Tanaka before the International Military Tribunal of the Far East during his post in Manchuria the revenue derived from the opium and other narcotics traffic became the chief source of revenue income for the Manchukuo government. Part of the narcotics was exported to Japan where they were used by a subsidiary tobacco industry of Mitsui of Mitsui zaibatsu in the production of special marketed cigarettes for the Chinese market bearing the then popular in the Far East trademark "Golden Bat". Including small doses of opium on their mouthpiece, apart from generating millions of addicted victims increasing the breakdown of Chinese society it also generated colossal profits for the Japanese economy that (according to testimony at the Tokyo War Crimes trials of 1948), Japanese military calculated to 300 million prewar dollars annually.

Considered successful in his mission to establish a profitable economy for the Japanese Empire in Manchuria, he was recalled to Japan in 1940 where he was selected to serve as chief of the "Project Department" inside the Finance Ministry to implement the economic reorganization of Japan under the Taisei Yokusankai in the second Konoe Cabinet. In 1941, he became a member of the House of Peers and at the same year he was appointed Chief Cabinet Secretary in the Tōjō administration with the task of moving the Japanese economy to a war economy footing with a state socialist basis.

After the surrender of Japan, he was arrested by the American occupation authorities and tried before the International Military Tribunal of the Far East as a Class A war criminal on counts 1, 27, 29, 31, 32 together with other members of the Manchurian administration responsible for the Japanese policies there. He was found guilty and sentenced to life imprisonment at Sugamo Prison in Tokyo while his close colleague general Kenji Doihara responsible for the smuggling of narcotics in the occupied and non-occupied areas was sentenced to death and hanged. According to the indictment, as tools of successive Japanese governments they "... pursued a systematic policy of weakening the native inhabitants' will to resist ... by directly and indirectly encouraging the increased production and importation of opium and other narcotics and by promoting the sale and consumption of such drugs among such people."

He was released from jail in 1958 and served as president or chairman of a number of companies, including the Tokyu Corporation. He published his memoirs in 1963, which created somewhat of a sensation for his undiminished admiration of Japanese accomplishments in Manchukuo, and his unexpected lack of respect for wartime leader Hideki Tōjō. He died in Tokyo in 1978.

References

Bibliography

External links 

1892 births
1987 deaths
People from Yokohama
University of Tokyo alumni
Japanese people of World War II
People of Manchukuo
Members of the House of Peers (Japan)
People convicted by the International Military Tribunal for the Far East
Japanese prisoners sentenced to life imprisonment
Prisoners sentenced to life imprisonment by international courts and tribunals
Imperial Rule Assistance Association politicians
20th-century Japanese politicians
Japanese politicians convicted of crimes